The following is a list of books, serials and films with Indian American or South Asian American subject matter.

Books
Non-fiction
The Karma of Brown Folk by Vijay Prashad 
Uncle Swami by Vijay Prashad
Everybody was Kung-Fu Fighting by Vijay Prashad
In My Own Country by Dr. Abraham Verghese
Olive Witch by Aheer Hoque
Asian-Indians of Chicago, Illinois (Images of America Series) by The Indo-American Center
The Truths We Hold: An American Journey by Kamala Harris
Here We Are: American Dreams, American Nightmares (A Memoir) by Aarti Namdev Shahani
Can't Is Not an Option: My American Story by Nikki Haley
The Other One Percent: Indians in America by Sanjoy Chakravorty, Devesh Kapur, Nirvikar Singh
Good Girls Marry Doctors: South Asian American Daughters on Obedience and Rebellion by Piyali Bhattacharya
A Part, Yet Apart: South Asians In Asian America by Lavina Shankar, Rajini Srikanth (Editor)

Science-fiction

Fiction
Caste and Outcast by Dhan Gopal Mukerji
The Tiger's Daughter by Bharati Mukherjee
Wife (novel) by Bharati Mukherjee
Jasmine (novel) by Bharati Mukherjee
Darkness (short stories) by Bharati Mukherjee
The Middleman and Other Stories by Bharati Mukherjee
The Inscrutable Americans by Anurag Mathur
The Namesake by Jhumpa Lahiri
Interpreter of Maladies by Jhumpa Lahiri (winner of 2000 Pulitzer Prize for Fiction)
The Mistress of Spices by Chitra Divakaruni
The Tennis Partner by Dr. Abraham Verghese
The Henna Artist by Alka Joshi
Bollywood Confidential by Sonia Singh
American Betiya by Anuradha D. Rajurkar
Family Life by Akhil Sharma
Zara Hossain is Here by Sabina Khan
Amina's Song by Hena Khan
Internment by Samira Ahmed
Well-Behaved Indian Women by Saumya Dave
A Place for Us by Fatima Farheen Mirza
The Sleepwalker's Guide to Dancing by Mira Jacob
Rising Tiger by Brad Thor

Magazines and newspapers

 https://www.newsindiatimes.com/ print and online newspaper  
 https://www.desitalk.com/ print and online newspaper  
 https://www.desitalkchicago.com/ print and online newspaper  
 https://www.gujarattimesusa.com/ print and online newspaper 
Telugu Naadi
 Telugu Patrika (monthly cultural magazine)
  Punjab Mail USA (print and online newspaper)
 India Abroad (newspaper)
 Little India (magazine)
 Quami Ekta (print & online newspaper)
 Lok News (print & online newspaper)
 Valley India Times (print & online newspaper)
 https://www.thejuggernaut.com; The Juggernaut (online publication)
 India Currents (digital magazine)
India-West Newspaper (print & online newspaper)
https://browngirlmagazine.com/ (online publication)
https://atlantadunia.com/Dunia/Default.aspx (online publication)
https://www.usadunia.com/
https://americankahani.com/ News, features, and commentary.

Feature films
Mississippi Masala (1991)
My Own Country (1998)
Chutney Popcorn (1999)
Monsoon Wedding (2001)
American Chai (2001)
American Desi (2001)
Provoked
The Guru (2002)
Bend It Like Beckham (2002) - covers all the Indian American sentiments even though it is a British film
Green Card Fever (2003)
Cosmopolitan (2003)
Dude, Where's the Party? (2003)
Flavors (film) (2003)
Harold & Kumar Go to White Castle (2004)
Bride & Prejudice (2004) - A largely British film also.
Anokha (2004)
Mistress of Spices (2005)
National Lampoon's Van Wilder: The Rise of Taj (2006)
Outsourced (2006)
The Namesake (2007)
Americanizing Shelley (2007)
Indian Cowboy (2007)
Kissing Cousins (2007)
Marigold (2007 film)
The Other End of the Line (2008)
1 a Minute (2010)
When Harry Tries to Marry (2011)
 Life! Camera Action... (2012)
The Distance Between Us (2013)
Million Dollar Arm (2014)
Meet the Patels (2014)
The Problem with Apu (2017)
The Big Sick (2017)
C/o Kancharapalem (2018)
India Sweets and Spices (2021)

Media
A